The 2012 Women's European Volleyball League was the fourth edition of the annual Women's European Volleyball League, which featured women's national volleyball teams from twelve European countries. A preliminary league round was played from June 1 to June 30, and the final four tournament, which was held at the Czech Republic on July 5–6, 2012.

During the league round, competing nations were drawn into three pools of four teams, and every team hosted a tournament with three other teams and playing a round-robin system over three days. One standings table was used, combined with all four tournaments. The Pool winners and the best runner up qualified for the final four round, joining the host team. If the final four host team finished first in its league round pool, the best pool runners-up qualified for the final four.

The Czech Republic defeated Bulgaria 3–0 in the final.

Teams

League round

Pool A

|}

Leg 1
The tournament was played at Hala sportova, Subotica, Serbia.

|}

Leg 2
The tournament was played at Sportmax 2, Budapest, Hungary.

|}

Leg 3
The tournament was played in Palau d'Esports de Granollers, Granollers, Spain.

|}

Leg 4
The tournament was played in Sala Polivalentă, Piatra Neamț, Romania.

|}

Pool B

|}

Leg 1
The tournament was played at Palace of Culture and Sports, Varna, Bulgaria.

|}

Leg 2
The tournament was played at Atatürk Sport Hall, Izmir, Turkey.

|}

Leg 3
The tournament was played at Salle Omnisport St. Léonard, Fribourg, Switzerland.

|}

Leg 4
The tournament was played at Complexe St. Symphorien, Metz, France.

|}

Pool C

|}

Leg 1
The tournament was played at Městská hala Vodová, Brno, Czech Republic.

|}

Leg 2
The tournament was played at Topsport Centre, Almere, Netherlands.

|}

Leg 3
The tournament was played at Metrowest Sport Palace, Ra'anana, Israel.

|}

Leg 4
The tournament was played at Neo Kleisto Orestiados, Orestiada, Greece.

|}

Final four
The final four was held at KV Arena in Karlovy Vary, Czech Republic on July 5/6, 2012.

Qualified teams

 (host)

Semifinals

|}

Third place match

|}

Final

|}

Final standing

Awards
MVP:  Aneta Havlíčková
Best Scorer:  Elitsa Vasileva
Best Spiker:  Elitsa Vasileva
Best Server:  Dobriana Rabadzhieva
Best Blocker:  Caroline Wensink
Best Receiver:  Helena Havelková
Best Setter:  Maja Ognjenović
Best Libero:  Julie Jasova

References

External links
 Confédération Européenne de Volleyball (CEV) – official website

European Volleyball League
European Volleyball League
International volleyball competitions hosted by the Czech Republic